Greg Gumbel (born May 3, 1946) is an American television sportscaster. He is best known for his various assignments for CBS Sports (most notably, the National Football League and NCAA basketball). The older brother of news and sportscaster Bryant Gumbel, he became the first African-American announcer to call play-by-play of a major sports championship in the United States when he announced Super Bowl XXXV for the CBS network in 2001. Gumbel is currently the studio host for CBS' men's college basketball coverage and was a play-by-play broadcaster for the NFL on CBS until 2023.

Biography

Early years
Gumbel was born in New Orleans, Louisiana, the first child of parents Richard Gumbel, a judge, and Rhea Alice LeCesne. As a young man, Gumbel grew up on Chicago's South Side, where he was raised Catholic, attending and graduating from De La Salle Institute. Before becoming a broadcaster, Gumbel graduated with a B.A. degree in English from Loras College in Dubuque, Iowa where he also played on the baseball team.  He also has two sisters, Renee Gumbel-Farrahi and Rhonda Gumbel-Thomas.

Career
In 1973, Greg's brother Bryant, then working as a television sportscaster at KNBC in Los Angeles, informed him that another NBC- owned and -operated station, WMAQ-TV in Chicago, was auditioning for a sports announcer. At the time, Greg was selling hospital supplies in Detroit. He ultimately got the job, returned to Chicago and worked at WMAQ-TV for seven years. The sportscaster he replaced, Dennis Swanson, went on to become president of ABC Sports.

Prior to his rising to prominence at CBS, Gumbel worked for MSG, ESPN, and WFAN radio in New York City. At ESPN, he anchored the show SportsCenter and did "play-by-play" for early NBA games. On MSG, Gumbel served as a backup announcer for Marv Albert on New York Knicks broadcasts as well as providing coverage for college basketball. When MSG signed a huge contract to broadcast New York Yankees games in 1989, Gumbel served as host of the pregame and postgame shows. In addition to his MSG duties, he was the host of the first radio morning show on radio station WFAN. However, station management replaced him with WNBC Radio personality Don Imus once WFAN took over WNBC's AM 660 frequency.

First CBS stint
Gumbel's CBS career began with part-time work as an NFL announcer in 1988. Also in 1989, Gumbel began announcing college basketball as well. He became host of The NFL Today (alongside Terry Bradshaw) for the 1990 to 1993 seasons. He also anchored CBS' coverage of Major League Baseball, college football, and, in 1999, CBS' coverage for the Daytona 500.

Besides his hosting duties, Gumbel provided play-by-play for the NBA (alongside Quinn Buckner), Major League Baseball including the 1993 American League Championship Series (alongside Jim Kaat), and College World Series baseball.

He was the prime time anchor for the 1994 Winter Olympic Games from Lillehammer, Norway and co-anchor for the weekday morning broadcasts of the 1992 Winter Olympics from Albertville, France.

NBC Sports
Gumbel moved to NBC in 1994 following CBS' losses of the NFL and Major League Baseball broadcasting contracts (Gumbel's last on-air assignment for CBS was providing play-by-play for the College World Series). While at NBC, Gumbel hosted NBC's coverage of the 1994 Major League Baseball All-Star Game. He also did play-by-play for the 1995 Major League Baseball National League Division Series and National League Championship Series (on both occasions, teaming with Joe Morgan), did play-by-play for The NBA on NBC, hosted NBC's daytime coverage of the 1996 Summer Olympics from Atlanta, Georgia, hosted the 1995 World Championships of Figure Skating, and served as the studio host for The NFL on NBC.

Current CBS career
Gumbel left NBC after the network broadcast of Super Bowl XXXII to return to CBS. His first major assignment was to serve as studio host for the network's coverage of college basketball, including the NCAA men's basketball tournament, something he continues to do to this day.

As CBS had just acquired the rights to NBC's previous NFL package, Gumbel joined the broadcast team as the lead announcer with fellow NBC alumnus Phil Simms as his color man. Gumbel was the lead announcer for the NFL on CBS between 1998 and 2003, calling Super Bowls XXXV and XXXVIII. For the 2004 NFL season, Gumbel traded positions with Jim Nantz as host of The NFL Today with Nantz taking over as lead announcer.

At the end of the 2005 NFL season, Gumbel was replaced as studio host of The NFL Today by James Brown. Gumbel returned to the broadcast booth as the #2 play-by-play man, replacing Dick Enberg, alongside color man Dan Dierdorf until Dierdorf retired after the 2013–14 NFL season. Gumbel also worked alongside Trent Green in the #3 team from 2014 until 2019. He worked in a three-man booth with Green and Bruce Arians for the 2018 NFL season. Gumbel then traded spots with Kevin Harlan in 2020, teaming with Rich Gannon. Adam Archuleta became Gumbel's partner in the #4 slot the following year after CBS declined to renew Gannon's contract.

CBS Sports extended its contract with Gumbel on March 15, 2023, which will allow him to continue hosting college basketball while stepping back from NFL coverage.

Personal life 
Greg, his wife Marcy, and Greg's married daughter Michelle all reside in the Fort Lauderdale, Florida area.

Politics
In 1999, Gumbel refused to attend a NASCAR banquet honoring Supreme Court Justice Clarence Thomas, on the basis that he disagreed with Thomas' positions on political issues.  He has regularly appeared on Howard Stern's radio show. Along similar lines, Gumbel said of Rush Limbaugh, "I find him someone whose words and opinions I can do without."

Legacy
Gumbel is the third man to serve as both host and play-by-play announcer for Super Bowls (the first two were Dick Enberg and Al Michaels respectively). He hosted Super Bowls XXVI, XXX, and XXXII before calling Super Bowls XXXV and XXXVIII. Jim Nantz became the fourth man to do so after he called Super Bowl XLI for CBS.

During his tenure as the chief anchor of The NFL Today, he served alongside co-anchors Dan Marino, Shannon Sharpe, and Boomer Esiason. The group was known to call him by his nickname "Gumby".

Career timeline
1979–1988: ESPN – Reporter, Anchor, Play-by-play
1989: MSG Network New York Yankees – Play-by-play
1989–1994: College Basketball on CBS – Play-by-play
1990–1993; 2004–2005: The NFL Today – Studio host
1991: Seattle Mariners Television – Play-by-play
1992–1993: Cleveland Cavaliers Television – Play-by-Play
1992: Winter Olympics – Weekend morning host
1994: Winter Olympics – Primetime host
1994: Major League Baseball All-Star Game – Host
1994–1995: MLB on NBC – #2 Play-by-play
1994–1998: NFL on NBC – Studio host
1994–1998: NBA on NBC – #2 Play-by-play
1995: World Figure Skating Championships – Host
1998–2004: NFL on CBS – Lead play-by-play
1998–present: College Basketball on CBS – Studio host
1990–1994; 2000–2002: College World Series on CBS – Play-by-play
2006–2022: NFL on CBS – Play-by-play (2006–2013: #2, 2014-19: #3, 2020–2022: #4)

External links
CBS Sports Team – CBS SportsLine.com
Issue 44 – Television Sportscasters (African-American)

References

1946 births
Living people
African-American sports journalists
American people of German-Jewish descent
American sports journalists
American television sports announcers
American sports radio personalities
College basketball announcers in the United States
College football announcers
De La Salle Institute alumni
Figure skating commentators
Loras College alumni
Major League Baseball broadcasters
Motorsport announcers
National Football League announcers
Television anchors from New York City
New York Giants announcers
New York Knicks announcers
New York Yankees announcers
Olympic Games broadcasters
Seattle Mariners announcers
Sportspeople from Chicago
Sportspeople from New Orleans
Sportspeople from Orlando, Florida
21st-century African-American people
20th-century African-American people